Emma Furuvik (born 1 October 1981) is an Icelandic alpine skier. She competed in the women's slalom at the 2002 Winter Olympics.

References

1981 births
Living people
Icelandic female alpine skiers
Olympic alpine skiers of Iceland
Alpine skiers at the 2002 Winter Olympics
Sportspeople from Stockholm
21st-century Icelandic women